Guernica (Spanish/Basque: Gernika) is a 2016 Spanish-British-American war romance drama film directed by Koldo Serra, starring James D'Arcy, María Valverde and Jack Davenport. It is the first feature film made about the 1937 bombing of Guernica.

The film centres on an American journalist (D'Arcy) covering the Spanish Civil War and the bombing of Guernica who falls in love with a censor (Valverde) for the Spanish Republican government. The journalist's character is loosely based on George Steer, a British reporter who covered the war and bombing for the UK media, as well as Ernest Hemingway and Robert Capa.

Cast
 James D'Arcy as Henry
 María Valverde as Teresa
 Jack Davenport as Vasyl
 Ingrid García Jonsson as Marta
 Álex García as Marco
 Bárbara Goenaga as Carmen
 Joachim Paul Assböck as Wolfram Freiherr von Richthofen
 Burn Gorman as Consul
 Markus Oberhauser as Captain

Production
Filming took place in the summer of 2015 in and around Bilbao.

Release
The film premiered at the Málaga Film Festival on 26 April 2016, the 79th anniversary of the bombing of Guernica.

See also
 Guernica (1950 film)
 Guernica (1937 Picasso painting)

References

External links
 
 

2016 films
English-language Spanish films
2010s German-language films
Basque-language films
2016 war drama films
2016 romantic drama films
Spanish war drama films
Spanish romantic drama films
American war drama films
American romantic drama films
Films set in 1937
Films set in Spain
Spanish Civil War films
Films shot in Spain
Films about war correspondents
2010s English-language films
2010s American films
2010s Spanish films
2010s British films
Pecado Films films